Khaemhat, also called Mahu was an ancient Egyptian high official in charge under king Amenhotep III (about 1388 BC to 1351 BC/1350 BC). Khaemhat was royal scribe and  overseer of the double granary of Upper and Lower Egypt and was therefore responsible for the grain and food supply to the royal palace. Khaemhat is mainly known from his Theban tomb chapel (TT57) that is decorated with reliefs and showing him twice in front of king Amenhotep III. Khaemhat is also mentioned on jar labels found at Malqata, the palace of the king. The inscriptions date to year 30 and year 39 of the king's reign, providing evidence that he was in charge in the later years of the king's 39 years long reign.

Khaemhat was the son of an official called Iemhotep.

References 

Officials of the Eighteenth Dynasty of Egypt
Ancient Egyptian overseers of the granaries